John Kenny (26 October 1907 – November 1994) was an English professional rugby league footballer who played in the 1920s and 1930s.

Background
John Kenny was born in Pendlebury, Lancashire, England, and he died aged 87.
John had 5 children, the oldest of which being John Kenny Junior, born December 1932, and Peter Kenny, who went on to play for Swinton Lions.

Playing career

International honours
Kenny won a cap for England while at Swinton in 1936 against Wales.

County Cup Final appearances
Kenny played , i.e. number 5, in Swinton's 8-10 defeat by Salford in the 1931 Lancashire County Cup Final during the 1931–32 season at The Cliff, Broughton, Salford on Saturday 21 November 1931.

References

1907 births
1994 deaths
England national rugby league team players
English rugby league players
Leigh Leopards players
Place of death missing
Rugby league players from Salford
Rugby league wingers
Swinton Lions players